WDTA-LD, virtual and UHF digital channel 35, is a low-powered Daystar owned-and-operated television station licensed Atlanta, Georgia, United States. The station is owned by the Word of God Fellowship. The station's transmitter is located in SunTrust Plaza in downtown Atlanta.  The office is located with WPXA-TV next to Six Flags White Water on Cobb Parkway (U.S. 41) in Marietta, and it uses a wireless studio/transmitter link.

History
Originally W22AH on channel 22, it was licensed in 1988 to serve Columbus, Georgia, over 100 km away.  The station changed to channel 53 (with a negative frequency offset) and became W53BR in the early 1990s, and later moved northeast into metro Atlanta around 1995, becoming WDTA-LP in 2001.  The station antenna had the exact geographic coordinates and height of WANN-CA, indicating they were diplexed into the same antenna. Broadcasting from the Bank of America Plaza in midtown Atlanta, its city of license at the time was Fayetteville, Georgia, a significant distance beyond its coverage area.

Because all stations are being forced from channels above 51, the station had a construction permit for channel 28, and an application to modify their permit for a much stronger upgrade on channel 50.  This application was approved as a construction permit, and would move the station antenna a few blocks south into downtown Atlanta to become the first broadcaster on the SunTrust Plaza (One Peachtree Center) building.  It would also have given it an omnidirectional broadcast range, as opposed to its previous cardioid directional antenna with a sharp null in its radiation pattern to the northwest.  However, this permit, granted in 2005, expired in 2008.

Additionally, the licensee applied for a digital facility on channel 47 from the same building, but only at 2 kW, equivalent to only 10 kW analog.  This was later changed to channel 35 at 1.5 kW, for which a CP was issued in late January 2009 for the standard period of three years.  In August 2009 it applied for 15 kW, and its permit was modified by the FCC in early September.  The station's effective radiated power was 112 kW on 53, and would have been 150 kW with beam tilt (116 kW in the horizontal plane) on 50.  Being at exactly the same height and location, this indicates that both the analog and digital transmitters would have been diplexed into the same antenna.

The station switched to digital in late spring 2010, using 53.1 as its virtual channel, and ending analog transmission after several months of crawls notified viewers it would eventually do so (though a date was never given).  In late October, it was granted a broadcast license to cover the changes, and its broadcast callsign suffix was changed from -LP to -LD.

External links

FCC query for digital application

DTA-LD
Daystar (TV network) affiliates
Television channels and stations established in 1988
Low-power television stations in the United States